Tex Lee Boggs (born May 13, 1938) is an American academic and retired politician who was a state senator in the Wyoming Senate from 1999 to 2006. He was president of Western Wyoming Community College and provost of Antioch University Los Angeles.

References

Democratic Party Wyoming state senators
Living people
1938 births
Heads of universities and colleges in the United States